Lugait, officially the Municipality of Lugait, is a 2nd class municipality in the province of Misamis Oriental, Philippines. According to the 2020 census, it has a population of 20,559 people.

It is also spelled as Luga-it.

History
Lugait was once one of the barrios of Initao, Misamis Oriental until 1948. When the town of Manticao became a separate municipality from Initao, Lugait became its biggest barrio with the biggest population and revenue contribution.

March 16, 1961, marked the autonomy of Lugait from its mother municipality when then President Carlos P. Garcia signed and announced Executive Order No. 425 that created the Municipality of Lugait in the province of Misamis Oriental.

As early as its creation, Lugait opened its doors to industrialization. It availed itself of the opportunities then prevailing at the time and soon the world came to know Lugait by the flow of its cement and G.I. roofing products in the market. These commodities became the community's by-word.

Geography
Lugait is bounded on the west by Iligan Bay; north by the municipality of Manticao, Misamis Oriental; and south by Iligan City.

The coasts of Lugait are suitable for anchorage and navigation. A private wharf in fact is located at Salimbal Point.

Lugait's weather patterns follow the wet and dry seasons prevalent throughout the country. It however enjoys a typhoon free topography.

Climate

Barangays
Lugait is politically subdivided into 8 barangays.
 Aya-aya
 Betahon
 Biga
 Calangahan
 Kaluknayan
 Talacogon (Lower Talacogon)
 Poblacion
 Upper Talacogon

Demographics

Religion

Lugait is predominantly of the Roman Catholic religion. Other religious groups include Assembly of God, the United Church of Christ in the Philippines (UCCP), Baptist and Bible Fundamental churches, Seventh Day Adventist Churches, Iglesia ni Kristo, and other denominations.

Economy

Most of the area is agricultural, although starting from the south-west at Salimbal Point in Poblacion, due to industrialization in neighboring Iligan City, hundreds of hectares are converted into industrial and commercial land on southern side of the Lugait river. More agricultural lands are now yielding to other purposes such as residential areas.

Cement, coconuts, fish and other fresh and processed marine products, bananas and garments are Lugait's major products. It also prides itself of its famous delicacy- arguably the tastiest bibingka or rice cake in this part of the country.

Major establishments in Lugait are Holcim Philippines, Inc., Mindanao Steel Corporation, Horizon Port Services and Trine Construction.

Infrastructure

Transportation

The municipality is accessible by plane through Laguindingan Airport in Laguindingan or by ship through the port of Iligan City. It may then be reached by bus, jeepney, taxi or van for hire. It usually takes only 30–45 minutes from Iligan City and 1½ hour ride from Cagayan de Oro. The common means of transportation to and from or within Lugait are jeepneys, buses, motorelas, tricycles, motorcycles for hire and taxis.

Utilities

All barangays in the municipality have electricity. This is being served by the Misamis Oriental Electric Cooperative (MORESCO-1). Located also in Lugait is the diesel-powered Mapalad Power Corporation (Formerly Northern Mindanao Power Corporation) that augments electric power consumption throughout the Northern Mindanao grid area. The National Power Corporation also maintains a sub-station in Lugait that had been recently upgraded with its power capacity expanded.

Telephone and internet services are being provided by PLDT-MARATEL. Mobile communications services are being catered by SMART Communications, GLOBE Telecom and Dito Telecommunity networks. They all maintain their respective transmitter antennae in the municipality providing Lugaitnons full signal access to these networks anywhere in the community including the hinterland barangays.

References

External links
 [ Philippine Standard Geographic Code]
Philippine Census Information
Local Governance Performance Management System

Municipalities of Misamis Oriental
Establishments by Philippine executive order